The Aluona is a river of Kėdainiai district municipality and Kaunas district municipality, Kaunas County, central Lithuania. It flows for 29.7 kilometres and has a basin area of 123.3 km². It is the right tributary of the Nevėžis river.

It begins near Dratkalnis village, at the border of Kėdainiai district municipality and Raseiniai district municipality. The Aluona flows mostly to the southeastern direction, crossing the Pernarava-Šaravai Forest. The valley of the lower course is deep, the river forms scarps. This section is declared as the Aluona Hydrographical Sanctuary.

The Aluona passes through Paaluonys, Šaravai, Skaistgiriai, Bajėnai I villages.

The hydronym Aluona is derived from the Lithuanian root al- as in the verb alėti ('to flow, to trickle').

External links
 Map of Nevėžis basin

References

Rivers of Lithuania
Kėdainiai District Municipality